Ben Patrick Joyce (born 9 September 1989) is an English footballer who plays as a midfielder for Plymouth Parkway.

Career

Early career
Joyce is a former Plymouth Argyle and Aston Villa striker, but signed for Swindon Town in July 2007 after leaving Plymouth. He came along with assistant manager David Byrne, eventually making his first team debut for Swindon Town on 19 April 2008, scoring a goal in the last minute of a 6–0 win.

Torquay United
After being released by Swindon in May 2009, Joyce signed for League Two side Torquay United in July. Joyce joined Conference South side Weston-super-Mare on a three-month loan deal in October 2009. He was recalled early from his loan spell however in November and he was sent out on loan to Conference National side Forest Green Rovers until January 2010 as a replacement for Sean Rigg. Joyce left Rovers in January and was released by Torquay on 15 May 2010 along with six other players.

Non-League
On 29 July 2010 Joyce signed for Salisbury City on a free transfer. He became part of a very prominent forward line at the Ray Mac as The Whites looked to win promotion.

After a trial period at Kettering, Joyce joined the Poppies on non-contract terms in March 2012. Joyce made his Kettering debut in a 1–0 loss against Hayes & Yeading United on 10 March 2012.

On 23 July 2012 Joyce signed for Weymouth. On 6 May 2014 Dorchester Town manager Phil Simkin confirmed that Joyce had signed for Dorchester Town. However, he joined Bodmin Town in December that year. He remained at the club until signing for Wadebridge Town for the 2016–17 season.

On 1 June 2017 it was announced that Joyce had signed for South West Peninsula League side Plymouth Parkway.

References

External links

1989 births
Living people
Footballers from Plymouth, Devon
English footballers
Association football forwards
Swindon Town F.C. players
Torquay United F.C. players
Forest Green Rovers F.C. players
Weston-super-Mare A.F.C. players
Salisbury City F.C. players
Kettering Town F.C. players
Weymouth F.C. players
Dorchester Town F.C. players
Bodmin Town F.C. players
Wadebridge Town F.C. players
English Football League players
National League (English football) players